Open Your Eyes is the fourth album by American punk rock band Goldfinger. It was released on May 21, 2002. This was the first album to feature former Ünloco guitarist, Brian Arthur, after Charlie's departure from the band.

Release
On March 7, 2002, Open Your Eyes was announced for release in two months' time. "Open Your Eyes" was released to radio in late March. In April and May 2002, the band toured the US and Canada with Sum 41. Open Your Eyes was released on May 21, 2002, through Jive and Mojo Records. In May and June, the band toured across the US, which was followed by three shows in Canada in July. In August, the band appeared at a few of the North-eastern Warped Tour shows. On August 13 and September 23, the band performed on the Last Call with Carson Daly. In October, the band toured across Australia. In April 2003, the band headlined the Skate and Surf Fest.

Reception

Open Your Eyes was met with generally favourable reviews from music critics.

Track listing
All songs are written by John Feldmann, except where noted.

Personnel
John Feldmann – rhythm guitar, lead vocals
Brian Arthur – lead guitar, backing vocals
Kelly LeMieux – bass, backing vocals
Darrin Pfeiffer – drums, backing vocals

Charts

Year-end charts

Notes

Goldfinger (band) albums
2002 albums
Jive Records albums
Albums produced by John Feldmann
Mojo Records albums